
Gmina Chrzypsko Wielkie is a rural gmina (administrative district) in Międzychód County, Greater Poland Voivodeship, in west-central Poland.

Villages
Gmina Chrzypsko Wielkie contains the villages and settlements of Białcz, Białokosz, Białokoszyce, Charcice, Chrzypsko Małe, Chrzypsko Wielkie, Gnuszyn, Łężce, Łężeczki, Mylin, Orle Wielkie, Ryżyn, Śródka and Strzyżmin.

Neighbouring gminas
Gmina Chrzypsko Wielkie is bordered by the gminas of Kwilcz, Pniewy, Sieraków and Wronki.

References

External links
Polish official population figures 2006

Chrzypsko Wielkie
Międzychód County